Jan Roëde, real name Jan Roede (13 June 1914 in Groningen – 30 May 2007) was a Dutch artist who worked in numerous disciplines.  He was a member of the Pulchri Studio in The Hague, and the Posthoorn-group.

References
Jan Roëde on artnet.com

1914 births
2007 deaths
Dutch artists
People from Groningen (city)